Gibbibarbus is a genus of ray-finned fish in the family Cyprinidae. 
It contains the following species:
 Gibbibarbus cyphotergous

References 

Cyprinidae genera
Taxonomy articles created by Polbot